Hugh de Pateshull (died December 1241) was a medieval Bishop of Coventry and Lichfield.

Pateshull was the son of Simon of Pattishall (a royal justice) and Simon's wife Amice. A royal clerk and a clerk of the exchequer, Hugh had custody of the Exchequer seal—Pateshull's position was a precursor office to the Chancellor of the Exchequer. He was also a canon of St. Paul's when he was selected to be Lord High Treasurer in 1234, holding that office until 1240.

Pateshull was elected bishop in 1239, and consecrated on 1 July 1240. He died on either 7 December or 8 December 1241 at Potterspury and was buried in Lichfield Cathedral.

Notes

Citations

References

 
 
 

13th-century English Roman Catholic bishops
Bishops of Lichfield
Hugh de Pateshull
Lord High Treasurers of England
Year of birth unknown